Blake James McGrath (born November 21, 1983) is a Canadian professional dancer, pop singer, actor, model, and choreographer. He was known for being on the first season of So You Think You Can Dance in 2005, and on the MTV reality dance show DanceLife. He has also developed a solo singing career with a debut album Time to Move in 2010.

Early career
McGrath was born in Mississauga, Ontario. He attended Cawthra Park Secondary School, School of the Arts and Applewood Heights Secondary School in Mississauga as well as St. Jean de Brebeuf Catholic Secondary School in Hamilton, Ontario.

His early television appearances include: Choices of the Heart: The Margaret Sanger Story (1997) playing Stuart Sanger, and the TV show recreation of Goosebumps book "Stay Out of the Basement", in which he played the brother Casey.

In 2015, McGrath was chosen to perform on Michael Jackson's thirtieth anniversary special. In 2006, he performed alongside Paulina Rubio at the 2004 Latin Grammy Awards. Also in 2006 he has an appearance in the documentary Freestyle (with Brian Friedman). He has appeared in Gap campaigns (with Sarah Jessica Parker), and in advertisements for iPod, JCPenney (which he also choreographed), and Hummer.

He has danced with stars such as Madonna, Britney Spears, Kylie Minogue, Janet Jackson, Adam Lambert, Ashanti, Destiny's Child, Katy Perry, Craig David, and Jewel.

In addition to his appearances on television shows, McGrath has also appeared in the films Butterbox Babies, Life With Mikey, Chicago, and Rent. He was also featured as a dancer in The Suite Life of Zack & Cody in the episode Commercial Breaks. He was a waiter, and studied at Tiffany Dance Academy in Hamilton Ontario, Deborah Thomson School of Dance in Brampton, Ontario and Joanne Chapman School of Dance in Brampton, Ontario.

He is owner of VIP Dance Events which tours major cities throughout Canada. Lastly, he appeared on the 9/10/13 episode of Dance Moms as a guest choreographer.

Dancing career
In 2005, McGrath participated as a contestant on So You Think You Can Dance. He appeared in the 2007 reality TV show DanceLife produced by Jennifer Lopez. In 2014, he appeared in the Lifetime hit Dance Moms as a guest choreographer for the Candy Apples Dance Center (CADC), the main rival of the Abby Lee Dance Company.

Choreography in So You Think You Can Dance Canada series (2008-2010)
He is the lead choreographer for the audition cities and alternating third judge on So You Think You Can Dance Canada. He has had contributions for all three seasons to date of the Canadian series as follows:

Musical career

 Blake started pursuing a music career and released his first single "The Night (Only Place To Go)" on April 27, 2010, on MuchMusic. He presented an award with Girlicious at the 2010 MuchMusic Video Awards on June 20, 2010. His follow-up single was Relax on August 3, 2010, which also won an MMVA award. On November 2, 2010, he released his first studio album Time to Move. It peaked at 39 on the Canadian Album charts. It was later released March 14, 2011, but failed to chart.
 He released his second studio album entitled "Love Revolution" on September 30, 2013.
 Blake's EP ‘’I am Blake McGrath was released in 2017 with the lead singles ‘Love Myself’ and  'Harder Than The First Time’.
 Blake's third studio album ‘’INNERvention’’ was released on September 6, 2019 with the lead singles ‘Dive In The Water’, ‘Innervention’ and ‘Breakthrough’. The album debuted in the top 20 the first week of sales on the Billboard Christian/Gospel album chart.

Personal life
As of 2019, McGrath lives in Los Angeles, California.

McGrath acknowledged he was bisexual in a 2009 interview with the Canadian gay magazine fab. "I've been attracted to men and attracted to women... My feelings change all the time. One day I can feel like I'm gay, another day like I'm straight. But I'm not just one or the other, I'm Blake McGrath and I'm attracted to somebody on the inside."

Discography

Studio albums

Extended plays

Singles

Tours
Stage Fright Tour (2011)
First tour for Blake McGrath's debut studio album "Time To Move"

Filmography
1993: Life with Mikey as an acrobat
1995: Butterbox Babies as Simon (age 7/8)
1995: Choices of the Heart: The Margaret Sanger Story as Stuart Sanger (TV movie)
1996: Goosebumps as Casey Brewer (in 2 episodes in TV series)
2002: Chicago as a male dancer
2004: Britney Spears Live from Miami as a dancer (TV movie)
2005: Rent as dancer (uncredited)
2007: Dancelife as himself
2013: Dance Moms as himself

References

External links
 McGrath's Official Twitter Page
 

1983 births
Living people
Canadian male dancers
Canadian pop singers
Musicians from Mississauga
So You Think You Can Dance (American TV series) contestants
Participants in Canadian reality television series
So You Think You Can Dance Canada
LGBT dancers
Canadian LGBT entertainers
21st-century American dancers
21st-century Canadian dancers
21st-century Canadian male singers
21st-century Canadian LGBT people